Ancestral Romance is the eighth full-length album by the Spanish power metal band Dark Moor, released on 24 November 2010.

Track listing
 "Gadir" - 4:59
 "Love from the Stone" - 4:02
 "Alaric de Marnac" - 4:42
 "Mio Cid" - 6:39
 "Just Rock" - 2:35
 "Tilt at Windmills" - 5:19
 "Canción del Pirata" - 5:39
 "Ritual Fire Dance" - 3:58
 "Ah! Wretched Me" - 4:59
 "A Music in My Soul" - 7:31

Concepts
"Canción del Pirata" means "Song of the Pirate" in Spanish and is based on a poem written by José de Espronceda.
"Ah! Wretched Me" is based on the "Life is a Dream" by Calderon de la Barca.
"Tilt at Windmills" is based on Don Quixote de La Mancha.
"Mio Cid" is inspired by the legend of the Spanish hero El Cid.
"Alaric de Marnac" is an adaptation of Paul Naschy's latest book of the same title.
"Love From the Stone" tells of the legend of the lovers of Teruel.
"Gadir" is inspired by the first city founded in Europe, Cádiz.
"Ritual Fire Dance" is based on Danza ritual del fuego by Spanish composer Manuel de Falla.

References
 DARK MOOR Official Website

2010 albums
Dark Moor albums
Scarlet Records albums